RRI may refer to:

Radio
 Radio Republik Indonesia, the Indonesian public radio network
 Radio Romania International
 RRI 1
 RRI 2

Other uses
 Raman Research Institute, Bangalore, India
 RepRisk Index, a proprietary risk metric
 Responsible Research and Innovation, notion used by the European Union
 Rights and Resources Initiative, an international coalition of organizations promoting land tenure reform for poor communities around the world
 RRI Energy, former name of GenOn Energy
 Road Routing Information within Integrated Transport Network data provided by Ordnance Survey
 RRI Rhein Ruhr International, Consulting Engineers